Ebrahimabad-e Bala Jowayin (also Romanized as Ebrāhīmābād-e Bālā Jowayin and Ebrāhīmābād-e Bālā Joveyn; also known as Ebrāhīmābād, Ibrāhīmābād, and Bāqeyrī) is a village in Zarrin Rural District, Atamalek District, Jowayin County, Razavi Khorasan Province, Iran. At the 2006 census, its population was 88, in 31 families.

References 

Populated places in Joveyn County